Horacio Javier Cervantes Chávez (born 17 October 1981, in Mexico City) is a former Mexican footballer, who last played as defender for Veracruz, on loan for Cruz Azul. His brother Diego Alberto Cervantes is also a footballer.

External links
 

1981 births
Living people
Footballers from Mexico City
Association football defenders
Club Universidad Nacional footballers
Atlético Morelia players
Atlante F.C. footballers
Club Necaxa footballers
Cruz Azul footballers
C.F. Pachuca players
Chiapas F.C. footballers
C.D. Veracruz footballers
Liga MX players
Mexican footballers